The 2021 Arkansas Razorbacks football team represented the University of Arkansas in the 2021 NCAA Division I FBS football season. The Razorbacks played their home games at Donald W. Reynolds Razorback Stadium in Fayetteville, Arkansas. Arkansas competed as a member of the West Division of the Southeastern Conference (SEC) and were led by second-year head coach Sam Pittman.

Previous season

The Razorbacks finished the COVID-19-shortened 2020 season 3–7, all in SEC play, to finish in sixth place in the West Division. On October 3, 2020, Arkansas defeated No. 16 Mississippi State, 21–14, snapping a 20-game SEC losing streak.

Preseason

Recruits
Arkansas signed 22 recruits for the 2021 class, 21 from high school and one from junior college.

Arkansas also signed six immediately eligible players from the transfer portal for the 2021 class.

SEC Media Days
The 2021 SEC Media Days were held July 19–22, 2021, at the Hyatt Regency Birmingham – The Wynfrey Hotel in Hoover, Alabama. The preseason polls were released on July 23, 2021. Arkansas placed sixth in the West Division in the preseason media poll, and five Arkansas players were selected to the all-SEC media teams.

Preseason media poll

Preseason all-SEC teams

Offense

1st team

Treylon Burks – WR

2nd team

Ricky Stromberg – C

3rd team

Myron Cunningham – OL

Defense

2nd team

Grant Morgan – LB

Jalen Catalon – DB

Personnel

Roster

Coaching staff

Regular season

Schedule
The Razorbacks' 2021 schedule was released on January 27, 2021, and will consist of 7 home games, 4 away games, and 1 neutral game in the regular season. The Razorbacks hosted SEC foes Auburn, Mississippi State, and Missouri in Fayetteville. The Hogs traveled to face Georgia, Ole Miss, LSU, and Alabama. Arkansas faced rival Texas A&M in Arlington, Texas.

Arkansas hosted all four of its non-conference games: against Rice from Conference USA, Texas from the Big 12 Conference, and Georgia Southern from the Sun Belt Conference in Fayetteville, and against Arkansas–Pine Bluff from the Southwestern Athletic Conference in Little Rock.

Game summaries

Rice

No. 15 Texas

Georgia Southern

vs. No. 7 Texas A&M

at No. 2 Georgia

at No. 17 Ole Miss

Auburn

Arkansas–Pine Bluff

No. 17 Mississippi State

at LSU

at No. 2 Alabama

Missouri

vs. Penn State (Outback Bowl)

Outback Bowl MVP - Arkansas QB K.J. Jefferson

Postseason
The 2021 Arkansas Razorbacks finished the season with a 9-4 overall record, 4-4 in SEC play, won the 2022 Outback Bowl over Penn State, and was ranked in the final AP Poll, finishing well above preseason expectations. The bowl win was Arkansas' first bowl victory on New Year's Day since beating the Texas Longhorns in the 2000 Cotton Bowl Classic. The bowl win was also Arkansas' first over a Big Ten opponent. Arkansas' victory over Texas on September 11 was the Razorbacks first win over the Longhorns in Fayetteville since 1981. Arkansas also, for the first time in school history, won all three rivalry trophy games in the same season, beating Texas A&M in Arlington, TX for the Southwest Classic Trophy, at LSU to win the Golden Boot Trophy, and Missouri in Fayetteville to win the Battle Line Rivalry Trophy. Arkansas also ended losing streaks of nine games versus Texas A&M, five games versus LSU, and five games versus Missouri.

Awards
WR Treylon Burks - AP and Coaches 1st Team All-SEC

CB Montaric Brown - Coaches 1st Team All-SEC

LB Bumper Pool - AP and Coaches 2nd Team All-SEC

C Ricky Stromberg - AP 2nd Team All-SEC

RB Raheim Sanders - SEC All-Freshman Team

PK Cam Little - SEC All-Freshman Team; Freshman All-American

LB Grant Morgan - 2021 Burlsworth Trophy winner

P/H Reid Bauer - 2021 Peter Mortell Holder of the Year Award winner

QB K.J. Jefferson - Outback Bowl MVP

HC Sam Pittman - AFCA Region 2 Coach of the Year

Players drafted in the NFL

Statistics

Team

Scores by quarter

Rankings

References

Arkansas
Arkansas Razorbacks football seasons
Arkansas Razorbacks football
ReliaQuest Bowl champion seasons